The 1990 KFK competitions in Ukraine were part of the 1990 Soviet KFK competitions that were conducted in the Soviet Union. It was 26th season of the KFK in Ukraine since its introduction in 1964. The winner eventually qualified to the 1991 Soviet Second League B.

Group 1 

Notes
 FC Druzhba Kyseliv withdrew after the first half, all its results were annulled.

Group 2

Group 3

Group 4

Group 5

Group 6

Final

External links
 ukr-footbal.org.ua

Ukrainian Football Amateur League seasons
Amateur